The St. Catharines General Hospital was a general hospital established in 1865 in St. Catharines, Ontario, Canada, serving the Niagara Region. First established as a general and marine cottage hospital, it moved to Queenston Street in 1870. The hospital closed on March 24, 2013, after the opening of a modern hospital on Fourth Avenue.

In 2017, Oakdale Inc. purchased the property. Demolition of the hospital commenced in 2019 and was completed in 2020. Some parts of the hospital, such as the decorative arch, were preserved for reconstruction due to their historical value. Bricks from the hospital were sold and the proceeds were donated to the Lincoln County Humane Society. During the demolition, underground tunnels and an underground swimming pool were discovered. One tunnel was connected to a church; another appeared to go underneath Queenston Street, but was covered with bricks.

See also 
 Welland House Hotel

References

Hospitals in Ontario
Hospital buildings completed in 1870
Hospitals established in 1865
Hospitals disestablished in 2013
Buildings and structures in St. Catharines
Defunct hospitals in Canada